East Asian identity is the objective or subjective state of perceiving oneself as an East Asian person and as relating to being East Asian. It has been discussed in media and academic publications in personal, cultural, economic and political terms.

Components
East Asian identity may consist of several interconnected parts, some or all of which may constitute an individual's identity:

East Asian peoplehood, a distinct pan-racial group, with unique genetic markers and cultural characteristics.
East Asian religion, indigenous religious practices and spirituality specific to the region.
East Asian culture, the observance of or participation in East Asian cultural traditions.

Background
East Asian identity has been described in scholarly works and research as an emergent identity, in economic, intellectual and cultural terms. Academic Glenn Hook has suggested that Japan emerged as the regional leader, in economic terms, in presenting an East Asian identity during the 1980s in G7 meetings, and proceeding to consciously present a cultural East Asian identity at the 1993 Tokyo G7 summit.

Joshua Kurlantzick, a CFR Fellow for Southeast Asia, in 2006 suggested that East Asian citizens were culturally building a "common East Asian identity". A multitude of factors have been cited as contributing towards the regional identity:
It concerns a sense of an East Asian identity that people of East Asia may have. Such an identity may be fostered through growing interactions among the people and civil society organizations in the region and through ideas, values, and norms thereby promoted and shared. An East Asian community may thus be recognized, supported, and developed by people of East Asia.

The 1997 Asian financial crisis is widely cited as centralizing phenomenon in the advancement of the identity. In economist Richard Baldwin's co-edited East Asian Economic Regionalism, the crisis was identified as trigger point for solidifying a growing East Asian identity. This concept has been widely researched across media and academic publications.

Dr Melissa Curley of The University of Queensland has proposed that mutual suspicion, particularly between the region's two largest powers (China and Japan), constitutes the most significant hurdle to the development of East Asian identity. Although acknowledging its emergence, academics Roger Goodman and Gordon White have theorized how a common East Asian identity risks obscuring non-marginal differences between societies in the region.

In 2014, research conducted by the ISEAS–Yusof Ishak Institute, proposed how the ASEM forum (an annual Asia-Europe conference) was linked with the building of the regional identity. Historian Arif Dirlik had theorized in this vein, that dialogue with the Western world was significant in the identity development of East Asia.

See also

References

East Asian culture
East Asian diaspora
East Asian people
Identity politics in East Asia